Smaug is a dragon and the main antagonist in J. R. R. Tolkien's 1937 novel The Hobbit, his treasure and the mountain he lives in being the goal of the quest. Powerful and fearsome, he invaded the Dwarf kingdom of Erebor 150 years prior to the events described in the novel. A group of thirteen dwarves mounted a quest to take the kingdom back, aided by the wizard Gandalf and the hobbit Bilbo Baggins. In The Hobbit, Thorin describes Smaug as "a most specially greedy, strong and wicked worm".

Critics have identified close parallels with what they presume are sources of Tolkien's inspiration, including the dragon in Beowulf, who is provoked by the stealing of a precious cup, and the speaking dragon Fafnir, who proposes a betrayal to Sigurd. A further source may be Henry Wadsworth Longfellow's 1855 poem The Song of Hiawatha, where Megissogwon, the spirit of wealth, is protected by an armoured shirt, but whose one weak spot is revealed by a talking bird. Commentators have noted Smaug's devious, vain, and proud character, and his aggressively polite way of speaking, like the British upper class.

Smaug was voiced and interpreted with performance capture by Benedict Cumberbatch in Peter Jackson's film adaptations of The Hobbit.

Story 

Dragons lived in the Withered Heath beyond the Grey Mountains. Smaug was "the greatest of the dragons of his day", already centuries old at the time he was first recorded. He heard rumours of the great wealth of the Dwarf-kingdom of Erebor, which had a prosperous trade with the Northmen of Dale. Smaug "arose and without warning came against King Thrór and descended on the mountain in flames". After driving the Dwarves out of their stronghold, Smaug occupied the interior of the mountain for the next 150 years, guarding a vast hoard of treasure. He destroyed the town of Dale; the Men retreated to the Long Lake, where they built Lake-town of houses on stilts, surrounded by water to guard against the dragon.

Gandalf realized that Smaug could pose a serious threat if used by Sauron. He therefore agreed to assist a party of Dwarves, led by Thrór's grandson Thorin Oakenshield, who set out to recapture the mountain and kill the dragon. Assuming that Smaug would not recognize the scent of a Hobbit, Gandalf recruited Bilbo Baggins to join the quest.

Upon reaching Erebor, the Dwarves sent Bilbo into Smaug's lair, and he was initially successful in stealing a beautiful golden cup as Smaug slept. Knowing the contents of the treasure hoard to the ounce, Smaug quickly realized the cup's absence upon awakening and searched for the thief on the Mountain. Unsuccessful, he returned to his hoard to lie in wait. The Dwarves sent Bilbo down the secret tunnel a second time. Smaug sensed Bilbo's presence immediately, even though Bilbo had rendered himself invisible with the One Ring, and accused the Hobbit (correctly) of trying to steal from him. During his discourse with the dragon, Bilbo noticed a small bare patch on Smaug's jewel-encrusted underbelly, and narrowly escaped. A thrush overheard Bilbo's account of the meeting, and learnt of the bare patch on Smaug's underside.

Still enraged, Smaug flew south to Laketown and set about destroying it. The townsmen's arrows and spears proved useless against the dragon's armoured body. The thrush told Bard the Bowman of Smaug's one weak spot, a bare patch on the dragon's belly. With his last arrow, Bard killed Smaug by shooting into this place.

Analysis

Character

Tolkien made Smaug "more villain than monster", writes the author and biographer Lynnette Porter; he is "devious and clever, vain and greedy, overly confident and proud." 
The fantasy author Sandra Unerman called Smaug "one of the most individual dragons in fiction". The Tolkien scholar Anne Petty said that "it was love at first sight", describing Smaug as "frightening, but surprisingly knowable".

The Tolkien scholar Tom Shippey notes the "bewilderment" that Smaug spreads: he is enchanted by gold and treasure, and those who come into contact with his powerful presence, what Tolkien describes as "the effect that dragon-talk has on the inexperienced", similarly become bewildered by greed. In Shippey's view, however, the most surprising aspect of Smaug's character is "his oddly circumlocutory mode of speech. He speaks in fact with the characteristic aggressive politeness of the British upper class, in which irritation and authority are in direct proportion to apparent deference or uncertainty." In sharp contrast to this is his vanity in response to flattery, rolling over "absurdly pleased" as Tolkien narrates, to reveal his marvellously armoured belly. Shippey comments that such paradoxes, "the oscillations between animal and intelligent behaviour, the contrast between creaking politeness and plain gloating over murder" join to create Smaug's principal attribute, "wiliness".

The Christian commentator Joseph Pearce describes Smaug's weak spot as his Achilles heel, noting his boastful over-confidence in his own indestructibility, and seeing in the fact that the vulnerability is over his heart a sign that "it is the wickedness of his heart which will lead to his downfall". Pearce likens Smaug's pride to that of Achilles, whose pride leads to the death of his best friend, and of many Greeks; and to the cockerel Chauntecleer in Geoffrey Chaucer's "The Nun's Priest's Tale", where a boastful reply to the flattering fox causes the cockerel's fall.

The Beowulf dragon

From 1925 to 1945, Tolkien was a professor of English Literature at Oxford University. He was a prominent scholar of the Old English poem Beowulf, on which he gave a lecture at the British Academy in 1936. He described the poem as one of his "most valued sources" for The Hobbit. Many of Smaug's attributes and behaviour in The Hobbit derive directly from the unnamed "old night-ravager" in Beowulf: great age; winged, fiery, and reptilian form; a stolen barrow within which he lies on his hoard; disturbance by a theft; and violent revenge on the lands all about, flying and attacking at night.

The scholars of English literature Stuart D. Lee and Elizabeth Solopova analyse the parallels between Smaug and the unnamed Beowulf dragon.

Fafnir

Smaug's ability to speak, the use of riddles, the element of betrayal, his enemy's communication via birds, and his weak spot could all have been inspired by the talking dragon Fafnir of the Völsunga saga. Shippey identified several points of similarity between Smaug and Fafnir.

Old English spell

Tolkien noted, in a joking letter that he was surprised to see published in The Observer in 1938, that "the dragon bears as name—a pseudonym—the past tense of the primitive Germanic verb smúgan, to squeeze through a hole: a low philological jest." Critics have explored what that jest might have been; an 11th-century medical text Lacnunga ("Leechings, Remedies") contains the Old English phrase wid smeogan wyrme, "against a penetrating worm" in a spell, which could also be translated "against crafty dragons". The Old English verb meant "to examine, to think out, to scrutinise", implying "subtle, crafty". Shippey comments that it is "appropriate" that Smaug has "the most sophisticated intelligence" in the book. All the same, Shippey notes, Tolkien has chosen the Old Norse verb smjúga, past tense smaug, rather than the Old English sméogan, past tense smeah—possibly, he suggests, because his enemies were Norse dwarves.

The Song of Hiawatha

John Garth, writing in The Guardian, notes the similarity between Smaug's death from Bard's last arrow and the death of Megissogwon in Henry Wadsworth Longfellow's 1855 poem The Song of Hiawatha. Megissogwon was the spirit of wealth, protected by an armoured shirt of wampum beads. Hiawatha shoots in vain, until he has only three arrows left. Mama the woodpecker sings to Hiawatha where Megissogwon's only weak point is, the tuft of hair on his head, just as Tolkien's thrush tells Bard where to shoot at Smaug.

Illustrations

Tolkien created numerous pencil sketches and two pieces of more detailed artwork portraying Smaug. The latter were a detailed ink and watercolour labelled Conversation with Smaug and a rough coloured pencil and ink sketch entitled Death of Smaug. While neither of these appeared in the original printing of The Hobbit due to cost constraints, both have been included in subsequent editions, particularly Conversation with Smaug. Death of Smaug was used for the cover of a UK paperback edition of The Hobbit.

Animated film

A dragon named 'Slag' features in Gene Deitch's brief 1967 animated film. 
Francis de Wolff voiced the red dragon in the long-lost 1968 BBC radio dramatization. 
Richard Boone voiced Smaug in the 1977 animated film by Rankin/Bass.

In the 2003 video game release, Smaug, voiced by James Horan, appears as a non-player character, based closely on the book.

The Hobbit (film series)

Smaug was voiced and interpreted with performance capture by Benedict Cumberbatch in Peter Jackson's three-part adaptation of The Hobbit. From the motion capture, Smaug's design was created with key frame animation. Weta Digital employed its proprietary "Tissue" software, which was honoured in 2013 with a "Scientific and Engineering Award" from the Academy of Motion Picture Arts and Sciences to make the dragon as realistic as possible. In addition, Weta Digital supervisor Joe Letteri said in an interview for USA Today that they used classic European and Asian dragons as inspirations to create Smaug. The Telegraph stated that Cumberbatch had "the authority to make of Smaug a cunning nemesis".

In the first film, The Hobbit: An Unexpected Journey, the audience sees only his legs, wings, and tail, and his eye; the eye is showcased in the final scene of the film. Smaug is a topic of discussion among the White Council as Gandalf's reason to support Thorin Oakenshield's quest. 

Smaug appears in the second film, The Hobbit: The Desolation of Smaug. In an interview with Joe Letteri, Smaug's design was changed to the wyvern-like form shown in the film after the crew saw how Benedict Cumberbatch performed Smaug while moving around on all four limbs.

In The Hobbit: The Battle of the Five Armies, Smaug attacks Lake-town. He is killed by Bard with a black arrow and his body falls on the boat carrying the fleeing Master of Lake-town. It is later revealed that Smaug's attack on Erebor was all part of Sauron's design, meaning that Smaug and Sauron were in league with each other.

Smaug was considered one of the highlights of the second film of the series (as well as his burning of Lake-Town in the third film); several critics hailed him as cinema's greatest dragon. Critics also praised the visual effects company Weta Digital and Cumberbatch's vocal and motion-capture performance for giving Smaug a fully realized personality, "hiss[ing] out his words with cold-blooded vitriol".

In the 2014 video game Lego The Hobbit, the portrayal departs more from the book; rather than ever more closely simulating the book's characters, the scholar Carol L. Robinson notes, the technology has allowed new fiction to be created.

In culture

In 2012, Smaug's wealth was estimated at $61 billion, placing him in the Forbes Fictional 15.

In 2011, scientists named a genus of southern African girdled lizards, Smaug. The lizards were so named after the fictional dragon for being armoured, dwelling underground, and native to Tolkien's birthplace, Bloemfontein. In 2015, a new species of shield bug was named Planois smaug, because of its size and its status "sleeping" in the researcher's collections for about 60 years until it was discovered. An ant species has been named Tetramorium smaug.

See also

 List of dragons
 Glaurung
 Slavic dragon#Smok

Notes

References

Primary
This list identifies each item's location in Tolkien's writings.

Secondary

Sources

  
  
  
  

Characters in The Hobbit
Literary characters introduced in 1937
Talking animals in fiction
Fictional dragons
Middle-earth monsters